Saleh Ibrahim (born 3 February 1936) is an Egyptian rower. He competed at the 1960 Summer Olympics and the 1964 Summer Olympics.

References

1936 births
Living people
Egyptian male rowers
Olympic rowers of Egypt
Rowers at the 1960 Summer Olympics
Rowers at the 1964 Summer Olympics
People from Damietta Governorate
20th-century Egyptian people